Karina Smirnoff (born January 2, 1978) is a Soviet-born American professional ballroom dancer of  Ukrainian origins. She is known as a professional dancer on Dancing with the Stars, where she won the thirteenth season with army veteran and soap opera star J. R. Martinez.
She has also won two runner-up titles, a semifinal title, and several quarterfinal titles.

She is a five-time U.S. National Champion, World Trophy Champion, and Asian Open Champion.  She has won the title at the UK Open, is a three-time champion at the US Open, two-time champion at the Asian Open, five-time champion at the Dutch Open, and five-time US National Professional Champion.  She has taken second at the British Open Blackpool Dance Festival, and the first woman to reach the British Professional Final with three different partners, and surpassed her own distinction by being the only woman to have made the final with four different partners between 1999 - 2006.

Early life
Karina Smirnoff was born  in Kharkiv, Ukrainian SSR, Soviet Union, and is of half-Greek and half-Russian Jewish descent. At 11, she began competing in ballroom dancing. She chose to pursue ballroom dancing. In 1993, Smirnoff immigrated to the United States.

Education
Smirnoff attended multiple schools, including Nerinx Hall High School in St. Louis and Christopher Columbus High School in The Bronx. She finally graduated from the Bronx High School of Science. Smirnoff graduated from New York City's Fordham University with a double major in economics and information system programming.

Career
Early in Smirnoff's dancing career, she and Roman Nabatov competed as an amateur couple for USA. They ended their dance partnership in January 1997. Smirnoff soon after started dancing with Paul Killick in October 1998 as a professional couple for England; this partnership ended in July 1999. Immediately, Louis Van Amstel and Karina Smirnoff, in July 1999, entered a professional dance partnership, representing the U.S.A; the partnership ended in December 2000. From January 2001 to September 2005, Smirnoff was in a dance partnership with Slavik Kryklyvyy and they represented the U.S.A; this partnership thus far is her most successful one. Kryklyvyy and Smirnoff earned numerous top titles and high ratings together.

Smirnoff appeared in the 2004 film Shall We Dance? as a dance instructor and was Stanley Tucci's dance partner. She also released a fitness DVD, Shape Up With Karina Smirnoff.

Her last professional partner recorded in competitions was Dmitri Timokhin representing Russia in October 2005. They won first place at the 2006 Grand-Prix Dynamo in Moscow. They finished dancing together in June 2006. Smirnoff was the project manager/director of a dancing event entitled "Day & Night", held on November 18, 2006 at the Hollywood & Highlands Grand Ballroom. She guest starred as Madame Escajeda in an episode of Hannah Montana. She is featured in a nude pictorial in the May 2011 American issue of Playboy magazine.

In November 2016, it was announced that Smirnoff would be joining the cast of E! reality series Famously Single for its second season.

Dancing with the Stars

Smirnoff was a performer on the third season of the ABC series Dancing with the Stars with celebrity partner Mario López. They finished in second place, losing to the team of Emmitt Smith and Cheryl Burke. Smirnoff
returned to the show on March 19, 2007 for Season 4, this time partnered with Billy Ray Cyrus, country singer and Hannah Montana star. The pair was the seventh to be eliminated from the competition on May 8, 2007. Her partner for Season 5 of the show was current five-division world champion boxer, Floyd Mayweather Jr. On October 16, 2007, Karina and Floyd were the fourth couple eliminated from competition and came in 9th place. She returned for Season 6, partnered with singer Mario and finished in 5th place. In Season 7, she was partnered with chef Rocco DiSpirito and they were the fourth pair to be eliminated with a finish of 9th place for the second time.

For the eighth season, Smirnoff's partner was Apple Inc. co-founder Steve Wozniak. They were eliminated in the fourth round on March 31, 2009, along with Holly Madison and her partner Dmitry Chaplin. For the ninth season, she was partnered with singer Aaron Carter.  They were eliminated on November 10, 2009, placing fifth. In the eleventh season, she was partnered with The Situation from MTV's reality TV show Jersey Shore. They were eliminated in the fourth week. In the twelfth season of Dancing with the Stars, she was partnered with movie star Ralph Macchio. They were eliminated in the semi-finals.

Smirnoff appeared on the thirteenth season of Dancing with the Stars, where she was partnered with All My Children actor J. R. Martinez. Smirnoff and Martinez ended up winning the competition against Rob Kardashian and his partner Cheryl Burke & Ricki Lake and her partner Derek Hough. This was the first time Smirnoff had advanced to the finals since her inaugural season in season 3 with Mario López. For the fourteenth season of Dancing With The Stars, Karina was partnered with singer Gavin DeGraw. They were eliminated in week 5. For the fifteenth season, she was partnered with season four winner, Apolo Anton Ohno and ended up placing 5th. For the sixteenth season, she is partnered with NFL star Jacoby Jones. Smirnoff became injured when she was performing a flip with partner Jones during rehearsals for their week 9 Lindy hop. The couple was able to reach finals but came in third place losing to Zendaya and Kellie Pickler who took second and first place respectively. For season 17 she was partnered with former High School Musical actor Corbin Bleu and landed in second place behind Amber Riley and Derek Hough. For season 18, she was partnered with former NHL player Sean Avery. They were the second couple eliminated in a double elimination on Week 2. This marked Smirnoff's earliest exit of the competition. For season 19 she was paired with UFC fighter and actor Randy Couture. They were eliminated in week 3, finishing in 11th place. After taking a one-season break, Smirnoff returned for season 21 and was paired with professional jockey, Victor Espinoza. The couple was eliminated on Week 2 and finished in 12th place. For season 22, she was partnered with former NFL quarterback Doug Flutie. They were eliminated on week 6 of competition and finished in 9th place.

Performances

With Mario Lopez (Season 3) 27.6

With Billy Ray Cyrus (Season 4) 19.0

With Floyd Mayweather Jr. (Season 5) 20.8

With Mario (Season 6) 25.4

With Rocco DiSpirito (Season 7) 17.8

Would have been eliminated, but was not after Misty May-Treanor suffered an injury and was forced to withdraw from competition.

With Steve Wozniak (Season 8) 13.0

With Aaron Carter (Season 9) 24.0

Score was awarded by stand-in judge Baz Luhrmann.

With Mike "The Situation" Sorrentino (Season 11)
Season average: 16.2; placed 9th

As part of acoustic music/double-scoring week, the judges had to give scores for both technical and performance.

With Ralph Macchio (Season 12)
Season average: 23.4; placed 4th

Additional scores for Week 7 were awarded by guest judge Donnie Burns.

With J.R. Martinez (Season 13)
Season average: 26.4; placed 1st

With Gavin DeGraw (Season 14)
Season average: 21.4; placed 9th

With Apolo Anton Ohno (Season 15)
Season average: 27.3; placed 5th

The additional score for Week 4 was awarded by guest judge Paula Abdul.
The dancer Ohno and Smirnoff chose for the Trio Challenge was Sasha Farber.

With Jacoby Jones (Season 16)
Season average: 25.6; placed 3rd

For the 'Len's Side-by-Side Challenge', Jones and Smirnoff chose Maksim Chmerkovskiy and Anna Trebunskaya to dance alongside them.
The dancer Jones and Smirnoff chose for the Trio Challenge was Cheryl Burke.

With Corbin Bleu (Season 17) 27.4
Season 17 – Celebrity partner: Corbin Bleu; Season average: 27.4; placed 2nd

Week 4 score was given by Julianne Hough.
Week 8 score was given by Cher.
The dancer Bleu and Smirnoff chose for the Trio Challenge was Witney Carson.
Additional score for Week 10 was awarded by guest judge Maksim Chmerkovskiy.

With Sean Avery (Season 18) 20.5
Season 18 – Celebrity partner: Sean Avery; Season average: 20.5; placed 11th

With Randy Couture (Season 19) 28.3
Season 19 – Celebrity partner: Randy Couture; Season average: 28.3; placed 11th

Week 3 score was awarded by Kevin Hart in place of Len Goodman.

With Victor Espinoza (Season 21) 17.3
Season 21 – Celebrity partner: Victor Espinoza; Season average: 17.3; placed: 12th

With Doug Flutie (Season 22) 19.2
Season 22 – Celebrity partner: Doug Flutie; Season average:19.2; placed: 9th

1 Score given by guest judge Zendaya.2 For this week only, as part of "America's Switch Up", Flutie performed with Peta Murgatroyd instead of Smirnoff. Smirnoff performed with Antonio Brown.3 Score given by guest judge Maksim Chmerkovskiy.

Personal life
Smirnoff grew up as an only child. Her parents own a liquor store in Staten Island. She has an American Staffordshire Terrier dog named Randy.

She was engaged to fellow DWTS pro and Ukrainian Maksim Chmerkovskiy for nine months in 2009.

In October 2009, Smirnoff began dating Major League Baseball pitcher Brad Penny. They became engaged in October 2010, but ended the engagement in December 2011.

Smirnoff became engaged to entrepreneur Jason Adelman in January 2015.  On March 11, 2015, both individuals announced that they had split and their engagement was off.

In the summer of 2015 she was featured with her cast mates on Celebrity Family Feud. On the stage she danced a salsa number with host Steve Harvey. Her fellow dancers gave them a perfect "10."

In April 2020, Smirnoff gave birth to her first child, Theo Gabriel,  with boyfriend Justinas Duknauskas.

References

External links

1978 births
Living people
American ballroom dancers
American female dancers
American people of Russian-Jewish descent
American people of Greek descent
Dancing with the Stars (American TV series) winners
Fordham University alumni
Dancers from Kharkiv
Ukrainian emigrants to the United States
Ukrainian people of Greek descent
Ukrainian people of Jewish descent
Ukrainian people of Russian descent
The Bronx High School of Science alumni
21st-century American women